Shod with Fire is a 1920 American silent Western film directed by Emmett J. Flynn and starring William Russell, Helen Ferguson, Betty Schade, Robert Cain, and George Stewart. It is based on the 1918 novel Bruce of the Circle A by Harold Titus. The film was released by Fox Film Corporation in February 1920.

Plot summary 
Bruce Bayard (William Russell) tries to help an ungrateful husband, who then accuses his wife of having an affair with Bayard.

Cast
 William Russell as Bruce Bayard
 Helen Ferguson as Ann Lytton
 Betty Schade as Nora Brewster
 Robert Cain as Ned Lytton
 George Stewart as Benny Lynch
 Nelson McDowell as The Parson
 Jack Connolly as Tommy Clary

Preservation
The film is now considered lost.

References

External links
 

1920 films
1920 Western (genre) films
American black-and-white films
Fox Film films
Films based on American novels
Lost American films
Silent American Western (genre) films
1920s American films